Coldest winter may refer to:

 The coldest winter, see List of weather records
 The Coldest Winter: America and the Korean War (2007 book), a 2007 book about the Korean War
 "Coldest Winter" (song), 2008
 The Coldest Winter (comics), a sequel to the graphic novel The Coldest City

Other uses
 The Coldest Winter in Peking (1981 film)
 The Coldest Winter Ever (1999 novel)

See also
 Coldest place (disambiguation)
 Cold (disambiguation)
 Winter (disambiguation)